Ivanjševci is a small village in the Municipality of Moravske Toplice in the Prekmurje region of Slovenia.

There is narrow wooden open post and beam belfry erected in 1923 in the centre of the village.

References

External links
Ivanjševci on Geopedia

Populated places in the Municipality of Moravske Toplice